Carlos Alberto Cazarín Duarte (born June 16, 1974) is a Mexican football manager and former player.

References

1974 births
Living people
Mexican footballers
Mexican football managers
Association football defenders
Inter Riviera Maya footballers
Ascenso MX players
Footballers from Veracruz
People from Veracruz (city)